The Politics of Loudi in Hunan province in the People's Republic of China is structured in a dual party-government system like all other governing institutions in mainland China.

The Mayor of Loudi is the highest-ranking official in the People's Government of Loudi or Loudi Municipal Government. However, in the city's dual party-government governing system, the Mayor has less power than the Communist Party of Loudi Municipal Committee Secretary, colloquially termed the "CPC Party Chief of Loudi" or "Communist Party Secretary of Loudi".

History
On May 9, 2020, former party chief Gong Wusheng has been placed under investigation for "serious violations of laws and regulations" by the Central Commission for Discipline Inspection (CCDI), the party's internal disciplinary body, and the National Supervisory Commission, the highest anti-corruption agency of China. On November 2, he was expelled from the Communist Party of China.

List of mayors of Loudi

List of CPC Party secretaries of Loudi

References

Loudi
Loudi